Salto is a settlement in the southern part of the island of Fogo, Cape Verde. The village has a sightworthy church and some small shops, but no accommodation for tourists. Most of the inhabitants are farmers growing potatoes, vegetables and papayas. Several fields are irrigated using drip irrigation. Many fields were surrounded by stone walls to protect them against erosion.

Gallery

See also
List of villages and settlements in Cape Verde

References

Villages and settlements in Fogo, Cape Verde
São Filipe, Cape Verde